Ohio Township is one of nine townships in Spencer County, Indiana, U.S.A. As of the 2010 census, its population was 5,306 and it contained 2,287 housing units.  Ohio Township contains the city of Rockport.

History
Ohio Township was first settled in about 1818.

Geography

Cities and towns
Rockport

Unincorporated towns
Africa
Lake Mill
Patronville
Pueblo
Reo
Ritchie
Rock Hill
Silverdale

References

External links
 Indiana Township Association
 United Township Association of Indiana

Townships in Spencer County, Indiana
Townships in Indiana